Music from The Body is the soundtrack album to Roy Battersby's 1970 documentary film The Body, about human biology, narrated by Vanessa Redgrave and Frank Finlay.

History
The music was composed in collaboration between Pink Floyd member Roger Waters and Ron Geesin, the same year they worked together on Atom Heart Mother and employs biomusic, including, on the first track, sounds made by the human body (slaps, breathing, laughing, whispering, flatulence, etc.), in addition to more traditional guitar, piano and stringed instruments. The album's final track, "Give Birth to a Smile", features all four members of Pink Floyd, plus Geesin on piano, although David Gilmour, Nick Mason and Richard Wright are uncredited.

The child heard on opening track is Ron's son Joe Geesin.

The LP, being a complete re-recording of the score, features a different track listing from the original film soundtrack, and a 3 sided acetate does exist of the full version. The cover of the album features a Transparent Anatomical Manikin (TAM).

Waters did not release another album outside of Pink Floyd until 1984's The Pros and Cons of Hitch Hiking.

Track listing
All songs written by Ron Geesin, except where noted:

Side One
"Our Song" (Geesin/Waters) – 1:24
"Sea Shell and Stone" (Waters) – 2:17
"Red Stuff Writhe" – 1:11
"A Gentle Breeze Blew Through Life" – 1:19
"Lick Your Partners" – 0:35
"Bridge Passage for Three Plastic Teeth" – 0:35
"Chain of Life" (Waters) – 3:59
"The Womb Bit" (Geesin/Waters) – 2:06
"Embryo Thought" – 0:39
"March Past of the Embryos" – 1:08
"More Than Seven Dwarfs in Penis-Land" – 2:03
"Dance of the Red Corpuscles" – 2:04

Side Two
"Body Transport" (Geesin/Waters) – 3:16
"Hand Dance — Full Evening Dress" – 1:01
"Breathe" (Waters) – 2:53
"Old Folks Ascension" – 3:47
"Bed-Time-Dream-Clime" – 2:02
"Piddle in Perspex" – 0:57
"Embryonic Womb-Walk" – 1:14
"Mrs. Throat Goes Walking" – 2:05
"Sea Shell and Soft Stone" (Geesin/Waters) – 2:05
"Give Birth to a Smile" (Waters) – 2:49

Personnel

Roger Waters – bass guitar, vocals, acoustic guitar, tape effects, vocalizations
Ron Geesin – electric and acoustic guitars, Hammond organ, harmonium, piano, banjo, mandolin, tape effects, vocalizations
David Gilmour – electric guitar (on "Give Birth to a Smile"), uncredited
Nick Mason – drums (on "Give Birth to a Smile"), uncredited
Richard Wright – Hammond organ (on "Give Birth to a Smile"), uncredited
Hafliði Hallgrímsson – cello, uncredited

References

External links

Albums produced by Roger Waters
Roger Waters albums
1970 soundtrack albums
Pink Floyd
Harvest Records soundtracks
Albums produced by Ron Geesin
Documentary film soundtracks